Jeffrey Hardee Atwater (born April 8, 1958) is an American financier who served as the 3rd Chief Financial Officer of Florida from 2011 to 2017, and currently serves as Vice President for Strategic Initiatives and Chief Financial Officer at Florida Atlantic University. He is a member of the Republican Party.

Biography
Atwater moved to Florida at the age of four and grew up in North Palm Beach, Florida, where his father, a veteran World War II pilot and FBI agent, served as police chief. He went on to gain substantial experience in banking, and was elected to the North Palm Beach Village Council in 1993. Later, he served as chairman, president, and CEO of the Barnett Bank of Broward County and the Treasure Coast, and later as market president of Riverside National Bank for Broward and Palm Beach County.

In 2000, Atwater ran for the Florida House of Representatives from the 83rd District, defeating Democratic nominee Pam Dunston and independent Michael I. Danchuk. After just two years in the House, he ran for the Florida Senate from the 25th District, which included Palm Beach and Broward counties. Unopposed in the primary election, Atwater faced off against long-serving Democratic Attorney General of Florida Bob Butterworth in the general election, and, aided by then-Governor Jeb Bush's strong performance that year, defeated Butterworth by a solid margin. He was re-elected in 2004 with no opposition, and again in 2008, when he defeated Democrat Linda Bird, a realtor. From 2008 to 2010, he was President of the Florida Senate.

Following the decision by then-Chief Financial Officer Alex Sink to run for governor rather than seek re-election, Atwater jumped into the race to succeed Sink. In the general election, Atwater faced off against former State Representative Loranne Ausley, whom he defeated by 18 percentage points.

Though considered as a frontrunner, in April 2015, he declined to run for the United States Senate seat that incumbent Marco Rubio was expected to vacate before the 2016 elections to run for President of the United States.

In 2017, it was announced that Atwater would be resigning from his position as Chief Financial Officer of Florida to become Vice President for Strategic Initiatives and Chief Financial Officer at Florida Atlantic University.

Electoral history

References

External links
 Profile: Chief Financial Officer Jeffrey H. Atwater, myfloridacfo.com; accessed February 15, 2015.
 Project Vote Smart - Senator Jeffrey H. Atwater profile, votesmart.org; accessed February 15, 2015.
 Follow the Money - Jeffrey H. Atwater 
 2006 2004 2002 2000 campaign contributions
 Florida House of Representatives - Jeff Atwater
 Florida Senate - Jeff Atwater

|-

|-

|-

1958 births
21st-century American politicians
Chief Financial Officers of Florida
Republican Party Florida state senators
Living people
Republican Party members of the Florida House of Representatives
Politicians from St. Louis
People from North Palm Beach, Florida
Presidents of the Florida Senate
Warrington College of Business alumni
Florida Atlantic University people